I Don't Want to Dance or I Don't Wanna Dance may refer to:

Songs
"I Don't Wanna Dance" (Split Enz song)
"I Don't Wanna Dance" (Eddy Grant song)
"I Don't Wanna Dance" (Alex Gaudino song)
"I Don't Wanna Dance" (Hey Monday song)
"I Don't Want to Dance" by The Little Ones (2008)
"Don't Wanna Dance" (MØ song)

Albums
I Don't Want to Dance, an album by Loftland
 Don't Wanna Dance, an album by Tom Gaebel

Other uses
I Don't Wanna Dance (film), a 2021 Dutch drama
"I Don't Want to Dance", episode of Little Princess